The 1948 Pepperdine Waves football team represented George Pepperdine College as an independent during the 1948 college football season. The team was led by third-year head coach Warren Gaer. For the 1948 season only, the Waves played home games at Wrigley Field in Los Angeles. Pepperdine finished the season with a record of 4–5.

Schedule

Team players in the NFL
No Pepperdine players were selected in the 1949 NFL Draft.

The following player finished his collegiate playing career in 1948 at Pepperdine. He had played in the NFL during World War II, at age 19, and prior to playing football at Pepperdine.

Notes

References

Pepperdine
Pepperdine Waves football seasons
Pepperdine Waves football